Locate32 is an open source file finder for Windows 98/ME/NT 4.0/2000/XP/Vista/7/10. It works by indexing the files on the user's hard drives, thus making searches faster. Removable or remote drives can also be indexed. Installation is not required. One unpacks the program files anywhere on the hard disk and runs the executable directly. The first step you have to take is index your files by creating the database. Once indexed, the file names can be searched rapidly.  It can't search the insides of files but searches for titles rapidly and reliably.
It was written by Janne Huttunen who indicated in September 2011 that it will no longer be actively maintained. The latest and possibly last build is version 3.1 RC3m build 11.7100. As of August 2012 the project moved to SourceForge

References
https://lifehacker.com/use-locate32-and-dropbox-to-index-and-find-files-from-a-5753790

External links
 

Desktop search engines
Utilities for Windows